Gayle Albert Dull (May 4, 1883 – October 16, 1918) was an American middle-distance runner. He competed in the men's 3200 metres steeplechase at the 1908 Summer Olympics.

References

External links
 

1883 births
1918 deaths
Athletes (track and field) at the 1908 Summer Olympics
American male middle-distance runners
American male steeplechase runners
Olympic track and field athletes of the United States
Place of birth missing